Lora is one of the 51 union councils of Abbottabad District in the Khyber Pakhtunkhwa of Pakistan. Lora Union Council takes its name from the main village of area. The local language is pahari  but Urdu is also universally understood.
Tehsil Lora have 6 union councils. U.C Phallah, Lora, Seer Sharqi, Seer Gharbi, Goreeni and Nagri.

Location 

Tehsil Lora is located at an altitude of 1138 metres (3736 feet). It is situated in the southern part of Abbottabad District in Havelian Tehsil.  It is bounded by the following union councils, Nara to the north, Nagri Totial to the north and east, Goreeni to the south, and Phallah to the west.

Tehsil Lora is bisected by Nadi Haro (on which the Khanpur Dam is built). Locals grow seasonal crops such as Maize (makai) and Wheat (gandum).

Subdivisions
The Tehsil of Lora is subdivided into the following areas: Ghari, Ghora, Dheri Kiala, Lora, Narhota, Noorpur, Seri and Thath Karam Shah, Mohra Maira, Kundbatal, Ghambeer, Phallah, Roper. 
Lora is connected with Abbottabad via the Ghora Gali- Shah Maqsood road, the travelling time from Abbottabad is about 3 hours by bus and two hours by car. Murree is about 22 km from Lora and can be reached in 40 minutes . Islamabad is about 60 km and 90 minutes drive.

History
Tehsil Lora has always been an important place and also a business hub of Circle Lora which consists of six union councils (Lora, Goreeni, Phallah, Nagri Tutial, Seer Sharqi and Seer Gharbi). It lies at the peripheral boundary of Abbottabad and most of the people works in Islamabad due to easy access by road through the Ghora Gali- Rawalpindi road and now rakhala road is more important. The tribes of lora is Abbasis, Gujjars, Mughls, Junjua, Malik/Awans, Qureshies and others.

Local Cricket
 Cricket is widely have been playing in Circle lora. People of tehsil lora are promoting to their local talent in daily basics. they loves to play cricket. 

Union councils of Abbottabad District

fr:Lora (district d'Abbottabad)